In enzymology, a taxadiene 5alpha-hydroxylase is an enzyme that catalyzes the chemical reaction

taxa-4,11-diene + AH2 + O2  taxa-4(20),11-dien-5alpha-ol + A + H2O

The 3 substrates of this enzyme are taxa-4,11-diene, an electron acceptor AH2, and O2, whereas its 3 products are taxa-4(20),11-dien-5alpha-ol, the reduction product A, and H2O.

This enzyme belongs to the family of oxidoreductases, specifically those acting on paired donors, with O2 as oxidant and incorporation or reduction of oxygen. The oxygen incorporated need not be derive from O miscellaneous.  The systematic name of this enzyme class is taxa-4,11-diene,hydrogen-donor:oxygen oxidoreductase (5alpha-hydroxylating). This enzyme participates in diterpenoid biosynthesis.

References

Further reading 

 

EC 1.14.99
Enzymes of unknown structure